Paul III (died 20 August 694) was the Ecumenical Patriarch of Constantinople from 687 to 693.

References 

7th-century patriarchs of Constantinople
694 deaths